Raphick Rasif Jumadeen (born 12 April 1948) is a former West Indian international cricketer who played in twelve Test matches from 1972 to 1979. He scored a total of 84 runs in his Test career, including 56 in one innings.

References

External links

1948 births
Living people
West Indies Test cricketers
Trinidad and Tobago cricketers
South Trinidad cricketers
West Indies cricket team selectors